Alfa Romeo 80A was a bus produced by Italian manufacturer Alfa Romeo in the late 1920s. Succeeding the Alfa Romeo 40A, it was primarily used in Italy and was less successful in the rest of Europe.

Technical characteristics
Inside, it was equipped with single and double seats made of wood and came with two double doors on the right hand side and a single door on the driver's side.

Transport
 ATAC Romeo
 ATM Milan

See also
 List of buses

References

80A
Buses articles needing expert attention